Notable Syro-Malabar Catholics include:

Religious and spiritual

 Parambil Chandy Malpan (Malpan 1663–87)
 Joseph Kariattil (Appointed in 1782)
 Paremmakkal Thoma Kathanar (Appointed in 1786)
 Abraham Pandari (Poulose) (Appointed in 1798)
 Palackal Thoma Malpan (1780–1841)
 Kuriakose Elias Chavara (1805–71)
 Nidhiry Mani Kathanar (1842–1904)
 Aloysius Pazheparambil (1847–1919)
 Thomas Kurialachery (1873–1925)
 Augustine Kandathil (1874–1956), first head of the Syro-Malabar Church after the restoration of hierarchy
 
 Varghese Payyappilly Palakkappilly (1876–1929)
 Joseph C. Panjikaran (1888-1949)
 Thevarparampil Kunjachan (Kunjachan) (1891–1973)
 Alphonsa of India (1910–46)
 Euphrasia Eluvathingal (1877-1952)
 Joseph Parecattil (1912–87)
 Abel Periyappuram (1920–2001), monk, journalist, and lyricist, and the founder of Kalabhavan
 Antony Padiyara (1921–2000)
 Varkey Vithayathil (1927–2011)
 Abraham Kattumana (1944–1995)

Public service

 Thoma of Villarvattom (c. 15th century CE): The only Christian King in the history of the Indian sub-continent.
 Thachil Matthoo Tharakan 
 C. J. Varkey, Chunkath, Minister of Madras Presidency (1939).<ref name=thal>Fr. George Thalian: {{cite web|url=http://geocities.ws/kandathil/kandathil/kandathil.html |title=`The Great Archbishop Mar Augustine Kandathil, D. D.: the Outline of a Vocation'''}}, Mar Louis Memorial Press, 1961. (Postscript) (PDF).</ref>
 A. J. John, Anaparambil (1893–1957), Chief Minister of Travancore-Cochin (1951–53) and Governor of Madras.
 P. T. Chacko, Pullolil, Member of Indian Constituent Assembly from Travancore (1949–50), and Home Minister of Kerala (1960–64).
 K. K. Mathew, former supreme court judge

Literature and film industry

 Paremmakkal Thoma Kathanar - Author of the first travelogue in an Indian language (1778)
 P. C. Devassia, author, literary translator poet, and composer of Christian poetry in Sanskrit
Mathew Ulakamthara, author of epic Christu Gadha and recipient of Sabha Rathnam'', the highest honor of the Syro-Malabar Church.
 George Menachery, a scholar, historian and Papal Dignitary.
 Pius Malekandathil, a historian, author and scholar
 Santhosh George Kulangara -  entrepreneur and explorer

References